AETOS Security Management, now known as AETOS Holdings Pte Ltd, provides security services to a wide range of clientele. The company is officially an auxiliary police force permitted to be armed under regulations from the Police Force Act 2004.

Established on 31 March 2004, AETOS began operations following the merger of the Auxiliary Police Forces of PSA Corporation Ltd, Singapore Technologies Kinetics Ltd (ST Kinetics), and subsequently Changi International Airport Services Pte Ltd (CIAS). This brought together the country's security units in maritime, key installations protection and aviation under one roof.

It also conducts operations with assistance from Unmanned Aerial Vehicles (UAVs).

History

Origins
AETOS was established on 31 March 2004.  Since its establishment, it has merged the Auxiliary Police forces of CIAS, PSA Corporation and ST Kinetics as a result of an amalgamation exercise initiated by Temasek Holdings.

In 2007, AETOS participated in a security detail alongside PSA Singapore Terminals, Singapore Police Force and the Ministry of Defence at the Brain Container Terminal to simulate a security situation at the terminal.

In 2009, AETOS first secured the contract for the Marina Bay Countdown Celebration event.

On 13 October 2016, AETOS was acquired by Surbana Jurong, a Singaporean government-owned consultancy company focusing on infrastructure and urban development.

On 26 January 2018, the company officially inaugurated its present headquarters at 5 Corporation Drive in Singapore.

Post-Origin
Due to the difficulty to recruit Malaysian and Singaporean nationals in the rank of AETOS, the company began to recruit Taiwanese nationals willing to work in Singapore in 2016.

Some were deployed to work at land checkpoints alongside Singaporeans in 2018. According to reports from Radio Taiwan International, some Taiwanese nationals refuse to continue working due to the stress in their assigned job posts.

In June 2017, the Singapore Police Force (SPF) announced the arrest of two AETOS officers stationed at the Woodlands Checkpoint for planning to go to the Middle East and join ISIL.

In January 2018, AETOS announced that its Jurong West office has officially opened, which has a new command centre, indoor shooting ranges and a cash processing centre.

In September 2018, AETOS has initiated an investigation on an AETOS officer who was reported to be sleeping while on guard duty.

In January 2019, AETOS reported that one of its officers stationed at the Woodlands Checkpoint was found dead with a gunshot wound to the head by SPF officers.

In September 2019, AETOS signed a teaming agreement with TRD Singapore to provide countermeasure services against UAVs in Singapore.

In November 2019, AETOS signed an agreement with COSEM Safety & Security Services to provide integrated security and safety consultancy services. According to an AETOS news release, it is scheduled to start by Q1 2020.

On April 15, 2021, an AETOS officer by the name of Mahadi Muhamad Mukhtar was arrested by Singapore Police Force (SPF) officers, assisted by AETOS staff, for robbing an OT Credit moneylender with a Taurus Model 85 revolver he illegally took when he reported for work.

Company
In 2006, AETOS Security Management formed two wholly owned subsidiary, AETOS Security Consultants, and AETOS Security Training and Consultancy, to meet their broadened scope of unarmed business and training and consultancy business.

In 2015, AETOS was renamed to AETOS Holdings Pte Ltd, with a total of 4 subsidiaries, namely AETOS Security Management Pte Ltd (auxiliary police force), AETOS Guard Services (unarmed guards), AETOS Training Academy and AETOS Technology and Solutions.

CSR activities
From 1 April 2018 to 31 March 2019, the company was listed as a donor for Esplanade – Theatres on the Bay.

Personnel
The first general manager was BG(Ret) Andrew Tan (2004–2005). He was followed by Mr Kelvin Tan (2005–2008). This position was re-designated as executive director in 2008, when Mr Chua Chin Kiat took over. James Tan Chan Seng, the former Commissioner of the Singapore Civil Defence Force, served as the CEO from 2011 to 2019.

On 27 March 2019, Alfred Fox is appointed to be the CEO from 16 April 2019. Quek Poh Huat, who was responsible in AETOS' formation when PSA Corporation, ST Kinetics and Changi International Airport Services auxiliary police forces were integrated, has stepped down as chairman on the same date and is replaced by Chiang Chie Foo.

Requirements
Prospective candidates are required to pass strict background checks before they are required to participate in a seven-week residential training programme. Candidates who have law enforcement experience participate in a three-week residential training programme.

Training
Prospective AETOS recruits conduct shooting practice at the old Police Academy before the Jurong West office opened in 2018.

Organization Structure
The team comprises officers from the police force, military and public service entities. AETOS' armed and unarmed officers can be seen securing Singapore's airports, ports, key and strategic installations, as well as regional and local businesses and events. They are also the key security service provider for events such as the Marina Bay Singapore Countdown, Singapore Grand Prix, Singapore Airshow and the 2015 Southeast Asian Games.

Deployments
Some deployment sites of armed and unarmed AETOS Security professionals include:

 PSA Corporation
 Immigration & Checkpoints Authority
 Esplanade - Theatres on the Bay
 Singapore Cruise Centre
 Tanah Merah Ferry Terminal
 Police Cantonment Complex
 Singapore Changi Airport (providing part of the airside services)
 Woodlands Checkpoint
 Jurong Island Checkpoint
 Tan Tock Seng Hospital
 Changi Prison

Events
Major events secured by armed and unarmed AETOS Security professionals include:

 Marina Bay Countdown Celebration
 Chingay Parade
 Singapore F1 Grand Prix
 IISS Forum
 Singapore Airshow
 SEA Games 2015
 Shangri-La Dialogue
 National Day Parade

Uniforms

When AETOS was incorporated on 1 April 2004, AETOS officers continued to wear uniforms worn by officers from the antecedent Auxiliary Police Forces, namely Port of Singapore Authority Police (PSAP), Singapore Technologies Kinetics Police (STKP) and Changi International Airport Services Police (CIASP).

Under governmental direction, the uniform was modified to inject distinguishing features between them and that of those worn by officers of the Singapore Police Force to foster a more level playing field with other Auxiliary Police Forces in Singapore.

The new uniforms were a new corporate colour, tartan blue, and the material was pure polyester to poly viscose. New buttons and badges on the cap and collars incorporating AETOS's logo were used in place of similar logos to the Singapore Police Force.

Given its former affiliation with the Singapore Police Force, AETOS officers wore tartan blue uniform similar in design of the police force when the antecedent auxiliary police forces, PSA Police, STK Police and CIAS Police formed in 1947, 1967 and 1981 respectively. Uniforms were kept similar such that the general public would not be able to tell AETOS officers from regular police officers unless under close scrutiny. The primary distinguishing feature was the tartan top.

As a result of several uniform reviews both by the police and SIRD, Auxiliary Police Forces must don uniforms with distinctive differences with their regular counterparts.  AETOS retained the old metallic cap badges and collar lapels although they were replaced with embroidered versions in the SPF. AETOS officers also don box caps, depending on the security requirements of the clients and the operating environment.

References

Bibliography
 

Auxiliary police forces in Singapore
Temasek Holdings
Business services companies established in 2004
Singaporean brands